Əngəxaran (also, Angekharan and Engekharan) is a village and municipality in the Shamakhi Rayon of Azerbaijan.  It has a population of 856, known locally for its mineral springs. The name of the village is thought to mean place where bees are kept, Əng meaning bee and -an being a place suffix in the Tat language.

References 

Populated places in Shamakhi District